The English football club Southend United F.C. played in League Two in the 2010–11 season, finishing 13th out of 24 clubs. It played in the first round of the FA Cup and the second round of the Football League Cup, and reached the quarter-final of the Football League Trophy.

Season summary 
On 5 July 2010 former Sheffield Wednesday and Plymouth Argyle manager Paul Sturrock was announced as Southend's new manager with Tommy Widdrington as his assistant.  Sturrock's first signings for Southend were former Northampton Town left back Peter Gilbert and striker Barry Corr who was released by Exeter City.  Both players had played under Sturrock previously. With Southend being under a transfer embargo, both players could only sign pre-contract agreements.

A squad of 17 players were only registered in time to play on the eve of the new season as the club's transfer embargo was lifted. Sturrock led Southend to a respectable 13th-placed finish in his first season.

League table

Results

League Two

FA Cup

Football League Cup

Football League Trophy

Squad

References 

Southend United F.C. seasons
Southend United